The Barnes–Peery House, known commonly as the Barnes Mansion, is one of the oldest private homes of Jefferson County, Colorado, USA. It was built in 1865 by David Barnes, the first flour miller in Jefferson County, who had just moved his flouring mill (a business still operating today as the Golden Mill) to Golden after establishing it on Bear Creek to the south the year before. The Barnes home was the first major brick house in Jefferson County, and is designed in Italianate style, featuring rows of stone arched windows. A rear carriage house was built in 1871. While living here Barnes founded Loveland, Colorado, in 1873. After surviving a fire that destroyed its roof in 1875, the home went on to house other owners of the flour mill, including the Peery family who operated the business for much of the 20th century.

It was listed on the National Register of Historic Places in 2001.

See also
National Register of Historic Places listings in Jefferson County, Colorado

References

External links
 

Tourist attractions in Golden, Colorado
Buildings and structures in Golden, Colorado
Houses on the National Register of Historic Places in Colorado
Italianate architecture in Colorado
Houses completed in 1865
Houses in Jefferson County, Colorado
National Register of Historic Places in Jefferson County, Colorado